APL is an abbreviation, acronym, or initialism that may refer to:

Science and technology 
132524 APL, an asteroid
Abductor pollicis longus muscle, in the human hand
Acute promyelocytic leukemia, a subtype of acute myelogenous leukemia
Applied Physics Letters, a physics journal
Nampula Airport (IATA airport code: APL), in Mozambique

Computers
 .apl, the file extension of the Monkey's Audio metadata file
 AMD Performance Library, renamed Framewave, a computer compiler library
 APL (programming language), an array-based programming language
 APL (codepage), the character set for programming in APL
 Address Prefix List, a DNS record type
 Address programming language, an early high-level programming language developed in the Soviet Union
 Advanced Physical Layer, an extension of Ethernet 10BASE-T1L for field devices
 Alexa Presentation Language, a language for developing Amazon Alexa skills

Software licences
 Adaptive Public License, an Open Source license from the University of Victoria, Canada
 AROS Public License, a license of AROS Research Operating System
 Arphic Public License, a free font license

Organizations
APL (shipping company), a Singapore-based container and shipping company
Aden Protectorate Levies, a militia force for local defense of the Aden Protectorate
Advanced Production and Loading, a Norwegian marine engineering company formed in 1993
Afghanistan Premier League, an Afghan Twenty20 cricket league
Afghan Premier League, a men's football league in Afghanistan 
American Party of Labor, a Marxist-Leninist anti-revisionist party in the US
American Patriot League, a proposed American football spring league
American Premiere League, a Twenty20 cricket league in the US
American President Lines, a container transportation and shipping company
American Protective League, a World War I-era pro-war organization
Applied Physics Laboratory, at Johns Hopkins University
Association of Pension Lawyers, UK
Aurora Public Library (disambiguation)
Australian Professional Leagues, an Australian soccer governing body
Irish Anti-Partition League, a Northern Ireland political organisation

Other uses
apl.de.ap (born 1974), pseudonym of Allan Pineda Lindo, Filipino-American musician
 Auxiliary Personal Living, a US Navy hull classification for barracks craft; see